Roslyn-Wakari Association Football Club is an association football club based in Dunedin, New Zealand. They compete in the FootballSouth Premier League.

History
The club's history began in 1888 when the Wakari Football Association first played in the local Dunedin league. This was only 44 years after the foundation of Dunedin, and the club is one of the oldest existing football clubs in the country (the oldest, North Shore United, was founded in 1886). The Wakari AFC consisted of 14 members with 11 or 12 playing members. The first committee included Sir Robert Stout (Premier of NZ 1884–1897) as its president. The club obtained a farmer's paddock and a ditch was dug as the perimeter for the pitch, outside the ditch the ball was out.

In 1890 the Wakari AFC changed its name to Roslyn AFC. In 1895 the Roslyn AFC split into two clubs with the second becoming Wakari AFC. The next ten years saw friendly rivalry between the two clubs as they competed for the "Otago Banner". In 1904 the two clubs amalgamated to become Roslyn-Wakari AFC. The club went into recess from 1914 until 1929 when they re-entered the Otago Football Association competition.

Roslyn-Wakari is one of Dunedin's stronger club sides. The team reached the semi-finals of the Chatham Cup in 1968 and 1995 and the quarterfinals in 2006. Their senior men's team currently plays in the Footballsouth Premier League.

The home ground for the club is Ellis Park in Kaikorai Valley. Ellis Park was developed on an old tip site. In 1949 clubrooms were developed in the old stables which housed the horses which pulled the rubbish carts that filled in the grounds. Some of the wood used in modifying the old stables came from the demolition of an open-air swimming pool at the end of the top training ground in the Kaikorai Stream. The horse's head was adopted as the club's logo in recognition of this fact.  These clubrooms were burnt down as a fire brigade exercise when the club built the present clubrooms/gym/changing rooms facilities in 1971.

Notable players and club members
 Robert Stout (1844–1930), New Zealand politician
 Howard Broad (born 1957), New Zealand commissioner of Police
 Michael McGarry (born 1965), New Zealand footballer
 Graham Marshall, New Zealand footballer
 Clare Taylor (born 1965), English sportswoman
 Thomas Robins, New Zealand actor
 Kelly Brazier (born 1989), New Zealand rugby union player

References

 UltimateNZSoccer website's Roslyn-Wakari page

External links
 Roslyn Wakari AFC website

Association football clubs in Dunedin
Association football clubs established in 1888
1888 establishments in New Zealand